Lectionary 250, designated by siglum ℓ 250 (in the Gregory-Aland numbering) is a Greek manuscript of the New Testament, on parchment. Palaeographically it has been assigned to the 10th century.

Description 

The codex contains lessons from the Gospels and Epistles lectionary (Evangelistarium, Apostolarium).

The text is written in Greek uncial letters, on 198 parchment leaves, in three columns per page, 27 lines. It has breathing and accents, sign of interrogative; iota subscript, N ephelkystikon. The nomina sacra are written in an abbreviated way.

The lessons of the codex were red from Easter to Pentecost. There are 12 lessons for Passion and 2-3 for Resurrection.

History 

It has been assigned by the INTF to the 10th century. It was created in a large scriptorium in Constantinople.

The manuscript was donated to the Imperial Public Library in Petersburg in 1859 by A. Lobanov-Rostovsky.

The manuscript was examined and described by Eduard de Muralt.

The manuscript was added to the list of New Testament manuscripts by Gregory (number 250).

The manuscript is not cited in the critical editions of the Greek New Testament (UBS3).

The codex is housed at the Russian National Library (Gr.55) in Saint Petersburg.

See also 

 List of New Testament lectionaries
 Biblical manuscript
 Textual criticism
 Lectionary 248

Notes and references

Bibliography 

 Eduard de Muralt, Catalogue des manuscrits grecs de la Bibliothèque Impériale publique (Petersburg 1864), p. 31 (as LV)

External links 
 Lectionary 250 at the Russian National Library

Greek New Testament lectionaries
10th-century biblical manuscripts
National Library of Russia collection